Justinas Beržanskis (born 12 January 1989) is a Lithuanian steeplechase runner.

He finished eighth at the 2013 Summer Universiade, seventh at the 2015 Summer Universiade and tenth at the 2017 Summer Universiade. He competed at the 2009 European U23 Championships (1500 metres), 2014 European Championships and the 2018 European Championships without reaching the final.

His personal best time is 8:36.88 minutes, achieved at the 2018 European Championships in Berlin.

References

1989 births
Living people
Lithuanian male steeplechase runners
Competitors at the 2013 Summer Universiade
Competitors at the 2015 Summer Universiade
Competitors at the 2017 Summer Universiade